The 1997 Philadelphia Phillies season was the 115th season in the history of the franchise.

Offseason
 November 21, 1996: Rex Hudler was signed as a free agent by the Phillies.
 November 27, 1996: Ricardo Jordan and Toby Borland were traded by the Phillies to the New York Mets for Rico Brogna.
 December 12, 1996: Mark Portugal was signed as a free agent by the Phillies.
 February 25, 1997: Danny Tartabull was signed as a free agent by the Phillies.

Regular season
On June 28, 1997, the Phillies played the Atlanta Braves at Turner Field in Atlanta. In honor of the 50th anniversary of Jackie Robinson breaking professional baseball's color line, the Braves hosted a Turn Back the Clock game. The Braves wore 1938 Atlanta Black Crackers home uniforms and the Phillies wore 1938 Philadelphia Stars road uniforms. In 1938, the Black Crackers had played in the Negro American League and the Stars in the Negro National League.

J. D. Drew
Phillies' first round draft pick J. D. Drew and his agent Scott Boras elected not to sign with the Phillies, sticking to their guarantee that they would not sign for less than $10 million. The Phillies had no plan to pay an unproven player this amount of money, and despite Boras' warnings, drafted Drew nonetheless. Consequently, Drew ended up playing for the St. Paul Saints of the independent Northern League.

Season standings

The Phillies played extremely poorly in the first 100 games of the season, going 30–70, including a 4–22 stretch in the month of June. The team made a miraculous comeback in the last 62 games, going 38–24, the best of any team in the National League during that span. It was not enough, however, to get them out of last place.

Record vs. opponents

Notable transactions
 June 3, 1997: J. D. Drew was drafted by the Phillies in the 1st round (2nd pick) of the 1997 Major League Baseball draft, but did not sign.
 July 8, 1997: Midre Cummings was selected off waivers by the Phillies from the Pittsburgh Pirates.

1997 Game Log

|- style="background:#bfb"
| 1 || April 1 || @ Dodgers || 3–0 || Curt Schilling (1–0) || Ramón Martínez (0–1) || Ricky Bottalico (1) || 53,079 || 1–0
|- style="background:#fbb"
| 2 || April 2 || @ Dodgers || 1–5 || Hideo Nomo (1–0) || Calvin Maduro (0–1) || Darren Dreifort (1) || 37,195 || 1–1
|- style="background:#fbb"
| 3 || April 3 || @ Dodgers || 1–2 || Ismael Valdez (1–0) || Mark Leiter (0–1) || Todd Worrell (1) || 26,579 || 1–2
|- style="background:#fbb"
| 4 || April 4 || @ Padres || 3–13 || Tim Worrell (1–0) || Bobby Muñoz (0–1) || None || 20,903 || 1–3
|- style="background:#fbb"
| 5 || April 5 || @ Padres || 1–4 || Sterling Hitchcock (1–0) || Mike Mimbs (0–1) || Trevor Hoffman (1) || 44,807 || 1–4
|- style="background:#bfb"
| 6 || April 6 || @ Padres || 3–2 || Curt Schilling (2–0) || Joey Hamilton (1–1) || Ricky Bottalico (2) || 37,016 || 2–4
|- style="background:#fbb"
| 7 || April 7 || @ Giants || 3–4 || Shawn Estes (1–0) || Calvin Maduro (0–2) || Rod Beck (4) || 7,525 || 2–5
|- style="background:#bfb"
| 8 || April 8 || @ Giants || 2–1 || Mark Leiter (1–1) || Osvaldo Fernández (1–1) || Ricky Bottalico (3) || 6,260 || 3–5
|- style="background:#fbb"
| 9 || April 9 || @ Giants || 0–3 || Kirk Rueter (1–0) || Bobby Muñoz (0–2) || Rod Beck (5) || 7,617 || 3–6
|- style="background:#fbb"
| 10 || April 11 || Padres || 3–8 || Sterling Hitchcock (2–0) || Curt Schilling (2–1) || None || 36,774 || 3–7
|- style="background:#bbb"
| – || April 12 || Padres || colspan=6 | Postponed (rain); Makeup: August 25 as a traditional double-header
|- style="background:#fbb"
| 11 || April 13 || Padres || 1–3 || Tim Scott (1–0) || Ricky Bottalico (0–1) || Trevor Hoffman (2) || 16,613 || 3–8
|- style="background:#fbb"
| 12 || April 15 || Giants || 4–8 || William Van Landingham (1–0) || Bobby Muñoz (0–3) || None || 12,099 || 3–9
|- style="background:#fbb"
| 13 || April 16 || Giants || 5–6 (10) || Jim Poole (1–0) || Reggie Harris (0–1) || Rod Beck (8) || 12,109 || 3–10
|- style="background:#bbb"
| – || April 17 || Expos || colspan=6 | Postponed (rain); Makeup: April 20 as a traditional double-header
|- style="background:#bfb"
| 14 || April 18 || Expos || 8–3 || Calvin Maduro (1–2) || Jim Bullinger (0–3) || None || 11,883 || 4–10
|- style="background:#bfb"
| 15 || April 19 || Expos || 10–8 || Mark Leiter (2–1) || Carlos Pérez (2–1) || Ricky Bottalico (4) || 17,426 || 5–10
|- style="background:#fbb"
| 16 || April 20 (1) || Expos || 1–5 || Jeff Juden (2–0) || Bobby Muñoz (0–4) || Dave Veres (1) || see 2nd game || 5–11
|- style="background:#fbb"
| 17 || April 20 (2) || Expos || 0–3 || Pedro Martínez (2–0) || Mark Portugal (0–1) || Ugueth Urbina (1) || 20,262 || 5–12
|- style="background:#bfb"
| 18 || April 21 || @ Pirates || 10–2 || Curt Schilling (3–1) || Steve Cooke (1–3) || None || 9,015 || 6–12
|- style="background:#fbb"
| 19 || April 23 || @ Pirates || 2–3 || Ricardo Rincón (2–1) || Jerry Spradlin (0–1) || None || 8,850 || 6–13
|- style="background:#bfb"
| 20 || April 25 || @ Reds || 10–7 || Mark Leiter (3–1) || Dave Burba (3–2) || Ricky Bottalico (5) || 22,843 || 7–13
|- style="background:#fbb"
| 21 || April 26 || @ Reds || 2–10 || Pete Schourek (1–2) || Curt Schilling (3–2) || None || 27,357 || 7–14
|- style="background:#bbb"
| – || April 27 || @ Reds || colspan=6 | Postponed (rain); Makeup: May 26 as a traditional double-header
|- style="background:#fbb"
| 22 || April 28 || Pirates || 4–9 (12) || Marc Wilkins (1–0) || Mike Mimbs (0–2) || None || 12,017 || 7–15
|- style="background:#bfb"
| 23 || April 29 || Pirates || 8–2 || Calvin Maduro (2–2) || Matt Ruebel (1–2) || None || 12,453 || 8–15
|- style="background:#fbb"
| 24 || April 30 || Dodgers || 5–7 || Hideo Nomo (3–2) || Mark Leiter (3–2) || Todd Worrell (7) || 15,872 || 8–16
|-

|- style="background:#fbb"
| 25 || May 1 || Dodgers || 0–5 || Pedro Astacio (3–0) || Curt Schilling (3–3) || None || 16,546 || 8–17
|- style="background:#bfb"
| 26 || May 2 || @ Rockies || 7–4 || Bobby Muñoz (1–4) || Mark Thompson (3–2) || Ricky Bottalico (6) || 48,031 || 9–17
|- style="background:#fbb"
| 27 || May 3 || @ Rockies || 3–7 || Jamey Wright (4–1) || Mark Portugal (0–2) || None || 48,050 || 9–18
|- style="background:#fbb"
| 28 || May 4 || @ Rockies || 0–9 || Roger Bailey (4–1) || Calvin Maduro (2–3) || None || 48,107 || 9–19
|- style="background:#fbb"
| 29 || May 5 || @ Astros || 2–9 || Chris Holt (3–3) || Mark Leiter (3–3) || None || 11,268 || 9–20
|- style="background:#bfb"
| 30 || May 6 || @ Astros || 5–1 || Curt Schilling (4–3) || Ramón García (2–2) || None || 12,179 || 10–20
|- style="background:#fbb"
| 31 || May 7 || @ Cardinals || 7–14 || John Frascatore (2–1) || Reggie Harris (0–2) || None || 23,388 || 10–21
|- style="background:#fbb"
| 32 || May 8 || @ Cardinals || 2–6 || Andy Benes (2–1) || Mike Mimbs (0–3) || None || 32,264 || 10–22
|- style="background:#bfb"
| 33 || May 9 || Rockies || 3–1 || Calvin Maduro (3–3) || Roger Bailey (4–2) || Ricky Bottalico (7) || 13,564 || 11–22
|- style="background:#bfb"
| 34 || May 10 || Rockies || 5–4 (10) || Ricky Bottalico (1–1) || Steve Reed (0–1) || None || 17,629 || 12–22
|- style="background:#bfb"
| 35 || May 11 || Rockies || 3–1 || Curt Schilling (5–3) || John Thomson (0–1) || None || 21,282 || 13–22
|- style="background:#fbb"
| 36 || May 12 || Rockies || 2–9 || Mike DeJean (1–0) || Bobby Muñoz (1–5) || None || 12,603 || 13–23
|- style="background:#bfb"
| 37 || May 13 || Cardinals || 3–2 || Jerry Spradlin (1–1) || T. J. Mathews (1–2) || Ricky Bottalico (8) || 14,416 || 14–23
|- style="background:#fbb"
| 38 || May 14 || Cardinals || 3–12 || Todd Stottlemyre (2–2) || Calvin Maduro (3–4) || None || 14,799 || 14–24
|- style="background:#fbb"
| 39 || May 16 || Astros || 7–12 || Chris Holt (5–3) || Mark Leiter (3–4) || None || 13,456 || 14–25
|- style="background:#bfb"
| 40 || May 17 || Astros || 4–2 || Curt Schilling (6–3) || Shane Reynolds (4–4) || Ricky Bottalico (9) || 17,138 || 15–25
|- style="background:#bfb"
| 41 || May 18 || Astros || 5–3 || Garrett Stephenson (1–0) || Mike Hampton (2–4) || Ricky Bottalico (10) || 17,367 || 16–25
|- style="background:#fbb"
| 42 || May 19 || Astros || 5–9 || Darryl Kile (4–2) || Calvin Maduro (3–5) || None || 15,122 || 16–26
|- style="background:#bfb"
| 43 || May 20 || @ Cubs || 3–2 || Mark Leiter (4–4) || Frank Castillo (2–6) || Ricky Bottalico (11) || 20,186 || 17–26
|- style="background:#fbb"
| 44 || May 21 || @ Cubs || 0–7 || Kevin Foster (5–3) || Edgar Ramos (0–1) || None || 22,881 || 17–27
|- style="background:#fbb"
| 45 || May 22 || Mets || 3–10 || Bobby J. Jones (8–2) || Curt Schilling (6–4) || None || 18,486 || 17–28
|- style="background:#bfb"
| 46 || May 23 || Mets || 2–1 || Garrett Stephenson (2–0) || Dave Mlicki (0–4) || Ricky Bottalico (12) || 15,501 || 18–28
|- style="background:#fbb"
| 47 || May 24 || Mets || 4–8 || Armando Reynoso (3–0) || Calvin Maduro (3–6) || John Franco (13) || 19,090 || 18–29
|- style="background:#bbb"
| – || May 25 || Mets || colspan=6 | Postponed (rain); Makeup: September 15 as a traditional double-header
|- style="background:#fbb"
| 48 || May 26 (1) || @ Reds || 5–8 || John Smiley (5–6) || Mark Leiter (4–5) || Mike Remlinger (2) || see 2nd game || 18–30
|- style="background:#fbb"
| 49 || May 26 (2) || @ Reds || 4–8 || Mike Morgan (2–4) || Matt Beech (0–1) || None || 16,798 || 18–31
|- style="background:#bfb"
| 50 || May 27 || @ Reds || 2–1 || Curt Schilling (7–4) || Brett Tomko (0–1) || None || 17,297 || 19–31
|- style="background:#fbb"
| 51 || May 28 || @ Reds || 0–2 || Kent Mercker (2–5) || Garrett Stephenson (2–1) || Jeff Shaw (7) || 15,451 || 19–32
|- style="background:#fbb"
| 52 || May 30 || @ Mets || 3–7 || Dave Mlicki (1–4) || Edgar Ramos (0–2) || None || 17,401 || 19–33
|- style="background:#fbb"
| 53 || May 31 || @ Mets || 3–10 || Armando Reynoso (4–0) || Mark Leiter (4–6) || None || 28,526 || 19–34
|-

|- style="background:#fbb"
| 54 || June 1 || @ Mets || 5–8 || Rick Reed (4–2) || Matt Beech (0–2) || Cory Lidle (1) || 42,058 || 19–35
|- style="background:#bbb"
| – || June 2 || Reds || colspan=6 | Postponed (rain); Makeup: September 12 as a traditional double-header
|- style="background:#fbb"
| 55 || June 3 || Reds || 2–3 || Kent Mercker (3–5) || Curt Schilling (7–5) || Jeff Shaw (8) || 14,340 || 19–36
|- style="background:#fbb"
| 56 || June 4 || Cubs || 1–5 || Frank Castillo (3–7) || Garrett Stephenson (2–2) || None || 12,872 || 19–37
|- style="background:#bfb"
| 57 || June 5 || Cubs || 9–8 (10) || Ken Ryan (1–0) || Terry Adams (0–2) || None || 13,189 || 20–37
|- style="background:#fbb"
| 58 || June 6 || @ Pirates || 4–5 (10) || Marc Wilkins (5–0) || Jerry Spradlin (1–2) || None || 15,165 || 20–38
|- style="background:#fbb"
| 59 || June 7 || @ Pirates || 2–9 || Jon Lieber (3–7) || Ryan Nye (0–1) || None || 25,664 || 20–39
|- style="background:#bfb"
| 60 || June 8 || @ Pirates || 3–2 || Curt Schilling (8–5) || Steve Cooke (5–7) || Ricky Bottalico (13) || 30,667 || 21–39
|- style="background:#fbb"
| 61 || June 10 || @ Expos || 5–8 || Dave Veres (2–1) || Ricky Bottalico (1–2) || Lee Smith (5) || 27,823 || 21–40
|- style="background:#fbb"
| 62 || June 11 || @ Expos || 3–4 || Jim Bullinger (4–5) || Jerry Spradlin (1–3) || Ugueth Urbina (10) || 10,475 || 21–41
|- style="background:#bfb"
| 63 || June 13 || Blue Jays || 4–3 || Wayne Gomes (1–0) || Paul Spoljaric (0–3) || Ricky Bottalico (14) || 26,799 || 22–41
|- style="background:#fbb"
| 64 || June 14 || Blue Jays || 2–3 || Robert Person (2–4) || Ryan Nye (0–2) || Paul Quantrill (4) || 22,582 || 22–42
|- style="background:#fbb"
| 65 || June 15 || Blue Jays || 1–11 || Pat Hentgen (7–3) || Mark Leiter (4–7) || None || 30,516 || 22–43
|- style="background:#fbb"
| 66 || June 16 || @ Red Sox || 4–5 (10) || John Wasdin (1–3) || Ricky Bottalico (1–3) || None || 26,926 || 22–44
|- style="background:#fbb"
| 67 || June 17 || @ Red Sox || 6–12 || Aaron Sele (8–5) || Scott Ruffcorn (0–1) || Kerry Lacy (3) || 25,591 || 22–45
|- style="background:#fbb"
| 68 || June 18 || @ Red Sox || 2–4 || Jeff Suppan (2–0) || Curt Schilling (8–6) || Chris Hammond (1) || 27,502 || 22–46
|- style="background:#fbb"
| 69 || June 20 || Braves || 1–4 || Tom Glavine (7–4) || Mark Leiter (4–8) || None || 20,648 || 22–47
|- style="background:#fbb"
| 70 || June 21 || Braves || 8–9 || Brad Clontz (3–1) || Ron Blazier (0–1) || Mark Wohlers (15) || 24,309 || 22–48
|- style="background:#fbb"
| 71 || June 22 || Braves || 5–12 || Greg Maddux (9–3) || Garrett Stephenson (2–3) || None || 25,534 || 22–49
|- style="background:#bfb"
| 72 || June 23 || Marlins || 9–3 || Curt Schilling (9–6) || Rick Helling (2–5) || None || 18,033 || 23–49
|- style="background:#fbb"
| 73 || June 24 || Marlins || 1–4 || Al Leiter (6–5) || Scott Ruffcorn (0–2) || Robb Nen (20) || 16,300 || 23–50
|- style="background:#fbb"
| 74 || June 25 || Marlins || 5–7 || Alex Fernandez (8–6) || Reggie Harris (0–3) || Robb Nen (21) || 20,324 || 23–51
|- style="background:#fbb"
| 75 || June 26 || @ Braves || 4–5 || Denny Neagle (11–1) || Matt Beech (0–3) || Mark Wohlers (16) || 41,762 || 23–52
|- style="background:#fbb"
| 76 || June 27 || @ Braves || 1–7 || Greg Maddux (10–3) || Garrett Stephenson (2–4) || None || 48,234 || 23–53
|- style="background:#fbb"
| 77 || June 28 || @ Braves || 1–9 || John Smoltz (7–7) || Curt Schilling (9–7) || None || 48,557 || 23–54
|- style="background:#fbb"
| 78 || June 29 || @ Braves || 5–6 || Mike Bielecki (3–3) || Billy Brewer (0–1) || Mark Wohlers (17) || 47,902 || 23–55
|- style="background:#fbb"
| 79 || June 30 || @ Orioles || 1–8 || Mike Mussina (10–2) || Calvin Maduro (3–7) || None || 47,837 || 23–56
|-

|- style="background:#fbb"
| 80 || July 1 || @ Orioles || 1–4 || Scott Erickson (11–3) || Matt Beech (0–4) || Randy Myers (26) || 47,610 || 23–57
|- style="background:#fbb"
| 81 || July 2 || @ Orioles || 6–10 || Arthur Rhodes (5–2) || Jerry Spradlin (1–4) || None || 47,785 || 23–58
|- style="background:#fbb"
| 82 || July 3 || Cubs || 4–5 || Geremi González (5–2) || Curt Schilling (9–8) || Mel Rojas (8) || 40,213 || 23–59
|- style="background:#fbb"
| 83 || July 4 || Cubs || 3–9 || Terry Mulholland (6–9) || Scott Ruffcorn (0–3) || Kent Bottenfield (2) || 14,378 || 23–60
|- style="background:#bfb"
| 84 || July 5 || Cubs || 9–7 || Reggie Harris (1–3) || Bob Patterson (1–4) || Ricky Bottalico (15) || 37,680 || 24–60
|- style="background:#fbb"
| 85 || July 6 || Cubs || 4–8 || Frank Castillo (6–9) || Mark Leiter (4–9) || Mel Rojas (9) || 18,392 || 24–61
|- style="background:#bbcaff;"
| – || July 8 ||colspan="7" |1997 Major League Baseball All-Star Game at Jacobs Field in Cleveland
|- style="background:#fbb"
| 86 || July 10 || @ Marlins || 7–8 || Robb Nen (6–2) || Jerry Spradlin (1–5) || None || 23,438 || 24–62
|- style="background:#bfb"
| 87 || July 11 || @ Marlins || 13–3 || Curt Schilling (10–8) || Kevin Brown (8–6) || None || 22,225 || 25–62
|- style="background:#bbb"
| – || July 12 || @ Marlins || colspan=6 | Postponed (rain); Makeup: September 17 as a traditional double-header
|- style="background:#fbb"
| 88 || July 13 || @ Marlins || 3–9 || Alex Fernandez (10–7) || Mark Leiter (4–10) || None || 26,860 || 25–63
|- style="background:#fbb"
| 89 || July 14 || @ Braves || 6–10 || Kevin Millwood (1–0) || Billy Brewer (0–2) || Mark Wohlers (22) || 38,118 || 25–64
|- style="background:#bfb"
| 90 || July 15 || @ Braves || 8–1 || Garrett Stephenson (3–4) || John Smoltz (8–8) || None || 39,494 || 26–64
|- style="background:#bfb"
| 91 || July 16 || Expos || 6–0 || Curt Schilling (11–8) || Jim Bullinger (6–9) || None || 16,202 || 27–64
|- style="background:#fbb"
| 92 || July 17 || Expos || 4–5 || Carlos Pérez (9–6) || Matt Beech (0–5) || Ugueth Urbina (17) || 17,127 || 27–65
|- style="background:#bfb"
| 93 || July 18 || Pirates || 8–6 || Mark Leiter (5–10) || Jon Lieber (6–9) || Ricky Bottalico (16) || 19,676 || 28–65
|- style="background:#fbb"
| 94 || July 19 || Pirates || 3–13 || Steve Cooke (8–9) || Tyler Green (0–1) || None || 17,472 || 28–66
|- style="background:#bfb"
| 95 || July 20 || Pirates || 4–1 || Garrett Stephenson (4–4) || Jason Schmidt (4–6) || Ricky Bottalico (17) || 20,431 || 29–66
|- style="background:#fbb"
| 96 || July 21 || Pirates || 2–3 || Esteban Loaiza (7–7) || Curt Schilling (11–9) || Rich Loiselle (14) || 19,303 || 29–67
|- style="background:#fbb"
| 97 || July 22 || @ Giants || 5–8 || Mark Gardner (11–4) || Jerry Spradlin (1–6) || Rod Beck (31) || 12,630 || 29–68
|- style="background:#fbb"
| 98 || July 23 || @ Giants || 4–16 || Shawn Estes (13–4) || Mark Leiter (5–11) || None || 14,591 || 29–69
|- style="background:#bfb"
| 99 || July 24 || @ Giants || 7–4 || Wayne Gomes (2–0) || Joe Roa (2–5) || Ricky Bottalico (18) || 13,520 || 30–69
|- style="background:#fbb"
| 100 || July 25 || @ Dodgers || 1–8 || Chan Ho Park (9–5) || Garrett Stephenson (4–5) || None || 42,198 || 30–70
|- style="background:#fbb"
| 101 || July 26 || @ Dodgers || 1–4 || Darren Dreifort (4–1) || Curt Schilling (11–10) || Todd Worrell (24) || 43,603 || 30–71
|- style="background:#fbb"
| 102 || July 27 || @ Dodgers || 1–7 || Tom Candiotti (7–3) || Matt Beech (0–6) || None || 36,481 || 30–72
|- style="background:#bfb"
| 103 || July 28 || @ Padres || 8–4 || Mark Leiter (6–11) || Sean Bergman (2–4) || None || 17,382 || 31–72
|- style="background:#bfb"
| 104 || July 29 || @ Padres || 6–5 || Tyler Green (1–1) || Andy Ashby (6–7) || Ricky Bottalico (19) || 21,710 || 32–72
|- style="background:#bfb"
| 105 || July 31 || Cardinals || 2–1 (10) || Ricky Bottalico (2–3) || Tony Fossas (1–3) || None || 18,409 || 33–72
|-

|- style="background:#bfb"
| 106 || August 1 || Cardinals || 4–1 || Garrett Stephenson (5–5) || Andy Benes (7–6) || Ricky Bottalico (20) || 17,171 || 34–72
|- style="background:#fbb"
| 107 || August 2 || Cardinals || 1–2 || Todd Stottlemyre (11–7) || Matt Beech (0–7) || Dennis Eckersley (27) || 16,190 || 34–73
|- style="background:#bfb"
| 108 || August 3 || Cardinals || 10–1 || Mark Leiter (7–11) || Donovan Osborne (1–4) || None || 20,094 || 35–73
|- style="background:#bfb"
| 109 || August 4 || Rockies || 7–3 || Tyler Green (2–1) || Frank Castillo (8–10) || None || 15,230 || 36–73
|- style="background:#fbb"
| 110 || August 5 || Rockies || 2–4 || Darren Holmes (4–2) || Ricky Bottalico (2–4) || Jerry Dipoto (4) || 16,428 || 36–74
|- style="background:#bfb"
| 111 || August 6 || Astros || 6–4 || Garrett Stephenson (6–5) || Ramón García (4–8) || Ricky Bottalico (21) || 15,557 || 37–74
|- style="background:#bfb"
| 112 || August 7 || Astros || 6–5 (11) || Billy Brewer (1–2) || Tom Martin (4–3) || None || 18,046 || 38–74
|- style="background:#fbb"
| 113 || August 8 || @ Cardinals || 1–6 || Donovan Osborne (2–4) || Mark Leiter (7–12) || None || 38,300 || 38–75
|- style="background:#bfb"
| 114 || August 9 || @ Cardinals || 3–2 || Tyler Green (3–1) || Manny Aybar (0–2) || Ricky Bottalico (22) || 42,926 || 39–75
|- style="background:#bfb"
| 115 || August 10 || @ Cardinals || 8–0 || Curt Schilling (12–10) || Matt Morris (8–7) || None || 31,816 || 40–75
|- style="background:#bfb"
| 116 || August 12 || @ Rockies || 5–0 || Matt Beech (1–7) || John Thomson (4–7) || None || 48,228 || 41–75
|- style="background:#bfb"
| 117 || August 13 || @ Rockies || 12–8 || Mark Leiter (8–12) || Jamey Wright (6–8) || None || 48,491 || 42–75
|- style="background:#bfb"
| 118 || August 15 || @ Astros || 5–1 || Curt Schilling (13–10) || Chris Holt (7–9) || None || 31,837 || 43–75
|- style="background:#bfb"
| 119 || August 16 || @ Astros || 5–3 || Jerry Spradlin (2–6) || Billy Wagner (7–5) || Ricky Bottalico (23) || 28,260 || 44–75
|- style="background:#fbb"
| 120 || August 17 || @ Astros || 6–11 || Tom Martin (5–3) || Wayne Gomes (2–1) || Russ Springer (2) || 23,161 || 44–76
|- style="background:#bfb"
| 121 || August 18 || Giants || 12–3 || Matt Beech (2–7) || Mark Gardner (12–7) || None || 15,478 || 45–76
|- style="background:#fbb"
| 122 || August 19 || Giants || 5–9 || Shawn Estes (16–4) || Mark Leiter (8–13) || None || 17,379 || 45–77
|- style="background:#bbb"
| – || August 20 || Giants || colspan=6 | Postponed (rain); Makeup: September 11
|- style="background:#fbb"
| 123 || August 22 || Dodgers || 3–5 || Antonio Osuna (2–3) || Ricky Bottalico (2–5) || Todd Worrell (32) || 21,060 || 45–78
|- style="background:#fbb"
| 124 || August 23 || Dodgers || 3–4 || Hideo Nomo (12–10) || Tyler Green (3–2) || Todd Worrell (33) || 31,159 || 45–79
|- style="background:#fbb"
| 125 || August 24 || Dodgers || 1–5 || Ismael Valdez (9–10) || Matt Beech (2–8) || None || 23,363 || 45–80
|- style="background:#bfb"
| 126 || August 25 (1) || Padres || 10–1 || Mark Leiter (9–13) || Will Cunnane (6–3) || None || see 2nd game || 46–80
|- style="background:#bfb"
| 127 || August 25 (2) || Padres || 6–4 || Ron Blazier (1–1) || Andy Ashby (6–10) || Ricky Bottalico (24) || 16,025 || 47–80
|- style="background:#bfb"
| 128 || August 26 || Padres || 4–2 || Mike Grace (1–0) || Sterling Hitchcock (9–8) || Ricky Bottalico (25) || 14,491 || 48–80
|- style="background:#bfb"
| 129 || August 27 || Padres || 7–6 (12) || Wayne Gomes (3–1) || Jim Bruske (3–1) || None || 16,156 || 49–80
|- style="background:#fbb"
| 130 || August 29 || @ Tigers || 2–7 || Willie Blair (14–6) || Tyler Green (3–3) || None || 22,925 || 49–81
|- style="background:#bfb"
| 131 || August 30 || @ Tigers || 2–0 || Matt Beech (3–8) || Scott Sanders (4–12) || Ricky Bottalico (26) || 22,537 || 50–81
|- style="background:#fbb"
| 132 || August 31 || @ Tigers || 1–2 || Justin Thompson (12–10) || Mark Leiter (9–14) || Todd Jones (25) || 19,152 || 50–82
|-

|- style="background:#bfb"
| 133 || September 1 || Yankees || 5–1 || Curt Schilling (14–10) || Hideki Irabu (4–3) || None || 50,869 || 51–82
|- style="background:#bfb"
| 134 || September 2 || Yankees || 5–0 || Mike Grace (2–0) || Kenny Rogers (5–6) || None || 37,258 || 52–82
|- style="background:#bfb"
| 135 || September 3 || Yankees || 5–4 || Jerry Spradlin (3–6) || Mike Stanton (6–1) || None || 38,352 || 53–82
|- style="background:#bfb"
| 136 || September 4 || @ Expos || 6–4 || Matt Beech (4–8) || Pedro Martínez (16–7) || Ricky Bottalico (27) || 9,447 || 54–82
|- style="background:#fbb"
| 137 || September 5 || @ Expos || 1–7 || Mike Johnson (2–3) || Mark Leiter (9–15) || None || 11,193 || 54–83
|- style="background:#bfb"
| 138 || September 6 || @ Expos || 5–3 || Curt Schilling (15–10) || Marc Valdes (4–4) || None || 16,623 || 55–83
|- style="background:#bfb"
| 139 || September 7 || @ Expos || 2–1 || Ryan Karp (1–0) || Anthony Telford (4–5) || Ricky Bottalico (28) || 18,058 || 56–83
|- style="background:#bfb"
| 140 || September 8 || @ Mets || 13–4 || Mike Grace (3–0) || Jason Isringhausen (2–1) || None || 13,321 || 57–83
|- style="background:#bfb"
| 141 || September 9 || @ Mets || 1–0 || Tyler Green (4–3) || Dave Mlicki (7–11) || Ricky Bottalico (29) || 13,871 || 58–83
|- style="background:#fbb"
| 142 || September 10 || @ Mets || 2–10 || Brian Bohanon (5–4) || Matt Beech (4–9) || None || 13,257 || 58–84
|- style="background:#fbb"
| 143 || September 11 || Giants || 3–5 || Roberto Hernández (8–2) || Jerry Spradlin (3–7) || Rod Beck (36) || 18,165 || 58–85
|- style="background:#fbb"
| 144 || September 12 (1) || Reds || 2–4 || Mike Remlinger (7–8) || Garrett Stephenson (6–6) || Jeff Shaw (35) || see 2nd game || 58–86
|- style="background:#bfb"
| 145 || September 12 (2) || Reds || 9–1 || Mark Leiter (10–15) || Pete Schourek (5–8) || None || 17,546 || 59–86
|- style="background:#fbb"
| 146 || September 13 || Reds || 0–3 || Dave Burba (9–10) || Mike Grace (3–1) || Jeff Shaw (36) || 15,524 || 59–87
|- style="background:#fbb"
| 147 || September 14 || Reds || 4–6 || Brett Tomko (11–6) || Tyler Green (4–4) || Jeff Shaw (37) || 20,518 || 59–88
|- style="background:#fbb"
| 148 || September 15 (1) || Mets || 5–10 || Cory Lidle (7–1) || Ryan Karp (1–1) || None || see 2nd game || 59–89
|- style="background:#bfb"
| 149 || September 15 (2) || Mets || 2–1 || Darrin Winston (1–0) || Joe Crawford (2–3) || Ricky Bottalico (30) || 14,416 || 60–89
|- style="background:#bfb"
| 150 || September 16 || Mets || 3–2 || Curt Schilling (16–10) || Rick Reed (12–9) || None || 16,585 || 61–89
|- style="background:#bfb"
| 151 || September 17 (1) || @ Marlins || 5–2 || Garrett Stephenson (7–6) || Liván Hernández (9–2) || Ricky Bottalico (31) || see 2nd game || 62–89
|- style="background:#fbb"
| 152 || September 17 (2) || @ Marlins || 2–5 || Tony Saunders (4–6) || Mark Leiter (10–16) || Robb Nen (34) || 26,305 || 62–90
|- style="background:#fbb"
| 153 || September 18 || @ Marlins || 2–8 || Kevin Brown (15–8) || Mike Grace (3–2) || None || 16,677 || 62–91
|- style="background:#bfb"
| 154 || September 19 || @ Cubs || 10–5 || Darrin Winston (2–0) || Mark Clark (13–8) || Jerry Spradlin (1) || 18,174 || 63–91
|- style="background:#bfb"
| 155 || September 20 || @ Cubs || 3–2 || Wayne Gomes (4–1) || Terry Adams (2–9) || Ricky Bottalico (32) || 38,313 || 64–91
|- style="background:#fbb"
| 156 || September 21 || @ Cubs || 3–11 || Kevin Tapani (8–3) || Curt Schilling (16–11) || None || 29,922 || 64–92
|- style="background:#fbb"
| 157 || September 23 || Braves || 0–6 || Kevin Millwood (5–3) || Mark Leiter (10–17) || None || 14,264 || 64–93
|- style="background:#bfb"
| 158 || September 24 || Braves || 5–1 || Garrett Stephenson (8–6) || Paul Byrd (4–4) || None || 16,772 || 65–93
|- style="background:#fbb"
| 159 || September 25 || Braves || 2–3 (10) || Mike Cather (2–4) || Jerry Spradlin (3–8) || Brad Clontz (1) || 15,030 || 65–94
|- style="background:#bfb"
| 160 || September 26 || Marlins || 5–3 || Curt Schilling (17–11) || Antonio Alfonseca (1–3) || Ricky Bottalico (33) || 18,007 || 66–94
|- style="background:#bfb"
| 161 || September 27 || Marlins || 8–7 || Jerry Spradlin (4–8) || Rob Stanifer (1–2) || None || 17,664 || 67–94
|- style="background:#bfb"
| 162 || September 28 || Marlins || 8–7 || Wayne Gomes (5–1) || Félix Heredia (5–3) || Ricky Bottalico' (34) || 26,509 || 68–94
|-

Roster

Player stats

Batting

Starters by positionNote: Pos = Position; G = Games played; AB = At bats; H = Hits; Avg. = Batting average; HR = Home runs; RBI = Runs batted inOther battersNote: G = Games played; AB = At bats; H = Hits; Avg. = Batting average; HR = Home runs; RBI = Runs batted inPitching

Starting pitchersNote: G = Games pitched; IP = Innings pitched; W = Wins; L = Losses; ERA = Earned run average; SO = StrikeoutsOther pitchersNote: G = Games pitched; IP = Innings pitched; W = Wins; L = Losses; ERA = Earned run average; SO = StrikeoutsRelief pitchersNote: G = Games pitched; W = Wins; L = Losses; SV = Saves; ERA = Earned run average; SO = Strikeouts Farm system 

References

External links
1997 Philadelphia Phillies season at Baseball Reference''

Philadelphia Phillies seasons
Philadelphia Phillies season
Philadelphia Phillies